Nicholas Bruton (born 17 August 1981) is a former Australian rules footballer who played with the Western Bulldogs in the Australian Football League (AFL) in 2003. He also played for the Coburg VFL team.

References

External links

 

Living people
1981 births
Australian rules footballers from Victoria (Australia)
Western Bulldogs players